José Luis Calvo (born 28 March 1942) is a Spanish former sports shooter. He competed at the 1960, 1968, 1972 and the 1980 Summer Olympics.

References

1942 births
Living people
Spanish male sport shooters
Olympic shooters of Spain
Shooters at the 1960 Summer Olympics
Shooters at the 1968 Summer Olympics
Shooters at the 1972 Summer Olympics
Shooters at the 1980 Summer Olympics
People from Soria
Sportspeople from the Province of Soria
20th-century Spanish people